Christopher Lenz (born 22 September 1994) is a German professional footballer who plays as a left-back for Bundesliga club Eintracht Frankfurt.

Career statistics

Honours
Eintracht Frankfurt
UEFA Europa League: 2021–22

References

External links
 

Living people
1994 births
Footballers from Berlin
German footballers
Association football fullbacks
Germany youth international footballers
Hertha BSC II players
Borussia Mönchengladbach II players
1. FC Union Berlin players
Holstein Kiel players
Eintracht Frankfurt players
UEFA Europa League winning players
2. Bundesliga players
3. Liga players
Bundesliga players